Major (also called Willingdon Beauty, his name used when showing) is the first major character described by George Orwell in his 1945 novel Animal Farm. An elderly Middle White boar, his "purebred" of pigs is a kind, grandfatherly philosopher of change.

Major proposes a solution to the animals' desperate plight on Manor Farm under the Jones administration and inspires thoughts of a rebellion. He does not specify a time for the rebellion; it could be tomorrow or several generations down the road. But when he dies three days after delivering his speech, the animals immediately set to work on bringing about the rebellion, driving Jones and the farmhands off the farm and removing many of the implements of his rule.

The Seven Commandments that Snowball transcribes, which are supposed to encompass Major's general philosophy, are gradually altered and deformed under Napoleon until they have entirely different meanings from those originally intended. "Beasts of England", the song that came to Major in his dream, is later banned on Animal Farm by Napoleon and replaced by "Comrade Napoleon", a hymn composed by Minimus the pig that pledges allegiance to Animal Farm and to work to protect it.

Major's skull is dug up and saluted by the animals every day, even after the rebellion, as a sign of respect that the animals remember their roots and the roots of the Rebellion. Later, after Napoleon decides to accept the humans and strike bargains with them, he announces that the remains are to be disposed of because they represent the old days when Animal Farm was "violent and primitive" toward humans; toward the end of the story, Napoleon announces that he has reburied the skull.

In both film adaptations, Major dies while provoking the animals into rebelling. In the 1954 adaption (voiced by Maurice Denham), he dies suddenly while the animals are singing. In the 1999 version (voiced by Peter Ustinov), Farmer Jones slips in mud while investigating the sounds coming from the barn, setting off his shotgun and indirectly hitting Major in his backside so that he staggers backward and falls from the top of the barn to his death.

Major is broadly based on Karl Marx and Vladimir Lenin.

References

Fictional pigs
Animal Farm characters
Literary characters introduced in 1945
Fictional revolutionaries
Pigs in literature
Male characters in literature